Ernest Gold may refer to:

 Ernest Gold (meteorologist) (1881–1976), British meteorologist
 Ernest Gold (composer) (1921–1999), American composer